Do Bhai may refer to:

 Do Bhai (1947 film), 1947 Indian film
 Do Bhai (1969 film), 1969 Indian film

See also
 Bhai (disambiguation)